Knut Magnus Olsen (born 6 May 1954) is a Norwegian politician for the Centre Party.

He's been a deputy representative to the Parliament of Norway from Sogn og Fjordane from 2005 to 2013. He hails from Jølster.

In 2010, he became secretary-general of the Centre Party.

References

1954 births
Living people
Deputy members of the Storting
Centre Party (Norway) politicians
Sogn og Fjordane politicians